Ayna is a Turkish rock band formed in 1996 by Erhan Güleryüz and Cemil Özeren. AYNA consists of Erhan Güleryüz (vocal), Kaya Sevinç (guitar), Can Ergenler (bass), Bülent Akbay (drums) and Orçun Çolak (keyboard). The group broadcast a music program named Ayna'dan Yansıyanlar on TRT.

With their latest concert, they've reached a record number of 2,500,000 visitors. Besides being an album band, Ayna promotes themselves as a concert band. Meanwhile, Ayna have worked with more than twenty musicians, for which they have had only one condition, which is to maintain their great friendships in their private lives.

Awards 
Kral TV Video Music Awards, 1997, 1999, 2000, 2001 "Video Music Awards Best Group".
The only band in the Guinness World Records for giving more than 2000 concerts both in Turkey and worldwide.
 The only group with sales of more than 1 million albums in Turkey.
 To this date, AYNA has produced eight different albums regarding a total sale of more than 10 million.

Discography

Albums 
 Gittiğin Yağmurla Gel (1997)
 Dön Bak Ayna'ya (1998)
 Şarkılar - Türküler (1999)
 Çayımın Şekeri (2000)
 Bostancı Durağı (2002)
 Denizden Geliyoruz (2004)
 Nefes (2006)
 Asmalımescit (2010)
 Mavi Şarkılar (2011)
 20.1 (2017)

Singles 
 Sevmek (2015)
 Severek Ayrılanlar / 20th Year Special (2017)
 Mimoza (2018)
 Sultan (2019)
 İstanbul (2020)
 Salacak Sahili (2023)

EP's 
Öpsem Geçer mi? (2020)

Members 
 Erhan Güleryüz - Lead Vocal (1996–present)
 Kaya Sevinç - Guitar (2021–present)
 Orçun Çolak - Keyboard (1998–present)
 Can Ergenler - Bass Guitar (2005–present)
 Bülent Akbay - Drum (1999–2002 / 2007–present)

Past members 
 Cemil Özeren - Vocal (1996–2002)
 Can Güney - Guitar (1996–1999 / 2004–2019)
 Murathan Araz - Bass Guitar (1997–2002)
 Ayhan Öztoplu - Drum (1996–1998)
 Alper Çakır - Keyboard (1996–1998)
 Soner Doğanca - Drum (1998–1999)
 Türker Otçu - Guitar (2000–2002)
 Deniz Beydili - Bass Guitar (2003–2005)
 Ferda Orçun Aca - Drum (2003–2007)
Genco Kulaksız - Guitar (2019–2021)

References

External links 
 

Turkish rock music groups